Indira Vasanti Samarasekera  (née  Arulpragasam; April 11, 1952) is the former president and former vice-chancellor of the University of Alberta. She has been a member of the Independent Advisory Board for Senate Appointments, which advises on appointments to the Senate of Canada, since 2016.

Biography
Samarasekera was born in Colombo, Sri Lanka, of Sri Lankan Tamil descent, and was married to a Sinhalese, Sam Samarasekera and was divorced when her children were 7 and 3 years.

Education and career

Samarasekera received her B.Sc. in Mechanical Engineering from the University of Sri Lanka in 1974 and an M.S. in Mechanical Engineering from the University of California, Davis as a Fulbright Scholar in 1976. In 1977, she immigrated to Canada, where she received her PhD in Metallurgical Engineering at the University of British Columbia in 1980. That year, she began working in the Department of Metals and Materials Engineering at UBC with a focus on the continuous casting and hot rolling of steel. She was only the second woman appointed to the University of British Columbia's Faculty of Engineering.

In 2000, she was appointed UBC's vice-president of research. During her time in that role, the university's research funding from government, private donors and industry more than doubled, from $149 million to $377 million.

She succeeded Roderick Fraser as president and vice-chancellor of the University of Alberta on July 1, 2005, and served two terms, ending June 30, 2015. She was the first female president of any university in Alberta.

As of July 1, 2015, she was succeeded by David Turpin as president of the University of Alberta.

Awards and honorary degrees 

In 1991, Samarasekera was awarded NSERC's the E.W.R. Steacie Fellowship, an award that recognizes promising young Canadian researchers. In 2002, she was made an Officer of the Order of Canada. In 2012, she received Canada's Public Policy Forum Peter Lougheed award for leadership in public policy, and the Queen Elizabeth II Diamond Jubilee Medal.  In 2014, she was named a Foreign Associate of the National Academy of Engineering.

Samarasekera has received honorary degrees from the University of British Columbia, University of Toronto, the University of Waterloo, Queen's University Belfast, Université de Montréal and the University of Western Ontario.

In 2018 Samarasekera was awarded the Bessemer Gold Medal by the Institute of Materials, Minerals and Mining, an annual honour named after Sir Henry Bessemer awarded for outstanding services to the steel industry.

Board and committee service

Samarasekera was appointed to the board of directors for Scotiabank in 2008, and for Magna International in 2014. She was appointed chair of the Worldwide Universities Network in 2012, serves on the CEO of the Year Advisory Committee   and has served as both board member and chair of the National Institute for Nanotechnology (NINT).

Samarasekera is on the board of directors of TC Energy, owner of the Keystone Pipeline, appointed in 2016. 
  
She has served as a member of Canada's Science, Technology and Innovation Council (STIC), the Prime Minister's Advisory Committee on the Public Service, the Conference Board of Canada  and the Public Policy Forum.

From 2010 to 2012, she attended the World Economic Forum in Davos and has participated as either a speaker or a moderator.

Public profile
In July 2009, the University of Alberta purchased Samarasekera's private residence for $930,000, representing approximately $180,000 profit for Samarasekera, and the home was renovated by the university. University administration was criticized by some for the initiative, given budget shortfalls at the time. Brian Heidecker, chair of the University of Alberta's Board of Governors, said the purchase gave the university a strategic advantage, noting that the residence would serve as a strong inducement when recruiting future presidents. Samarasekera continues to live at the home and pays rent based on fair market value.

In an interview with the Edmonton Journal on October 21, 2009, Samarasekera raised her concerns regarding the fact that 58% of university undergraduates in Canada were female. She commented, "I'm going to be an advocate for young white men, because I can be. No one is going to question me when I say we have a problem", and "We'll wake up in 20 years and we will not have the benefit of enough male talent at the heads of companies and elsewhere." A group of students responded by putting up posters satirizing her comments. Campus Security took down the posters within 24 hours and warned the students responsible of possible disciplinary action."  Samaraskera responded by noting that she appreciated satire as a form of freedom of speech, but hoped that such debate be held in a cordial and respectable manner.

In the wake of deep government cuts to the cuts to the Alberta post-secondary sector in 2013, debate ensued on and off campus as to how the university should respond. Samarasekara undertook to limit her international travel. However, when personally invited by Alberta Premier Alison Redford, she traveled to China in September 2013 at a cost of $13,800. Responding to criticism, Samarasekara stated "people will find reasons to criticize me whichever way I do it."

References

Sources
University of Alberta bio information
Rising Up Against Rankings by Indira Samaasekera, Inside Higher Ed, April 2, 2007.
http://scotiabank.com/cda/content/0,1608,CID12292_LIDen,00.html 
https://www.cbc.ca/news/canada/edmonton/u-of-a-students-could-face-new-570-fee-1.924947
https://web.archive.org/web/20100226022300/http://www.edmontonjournal.com/administrators+face+furloughs+salary+cuts/2333907/story.html

1952 births
Living people
Canadian mechanical engineers
Canadian women engineers
Fellows of the Royal Society of Canada
Officers of the Order of Canada
Presidents of the University of Alberta
Alumni of the University of Sri Lanka (Peradeniya)
University of California, Davis alumni
Sri Lankan women engineers
Directors of Scotiabank
Canadian corporate directors
Canadian women in business
University of British Columbia Faculty of Applied Science alumni
Canadian university and college chief executives
Alumni of Ladies' College, Colombo
Sinhalese engineers
Alumni of the University of Sri Lanka
People from Colombo
Canadian academic administrators
Canadian women academics
20th-century Canadian scientists
21st-century Canadian scientists
20th-century Sri Lankan people
21st-century Sri Lankan people
21st-century women engineers
20th-century women engineers
Women heads of universities and colleges
Foreign associates of the National Academy of Engineering
Sri Lankan emigrants to Canada
Bessemer Gold Medal
20th-century Canadian women scientists
21st-century Canadian women scientists